Yoshii, Okayama may refer to:

Yoshii, Okayama (Akaiwa), Japan
Yoshii, Okayama (Shitsuki), Japan